Haley Lu Richardson (born March 7, 1995) is an American actress. Following early television roles on the Disney Channel sitcom Shake It Up (2013) and the ABC Family supernatural drama Ravenswood (2013–2014), she acted in the coming-of-age film The Edge of Seventeen (2016) and the psychological horror film Split (2016). 

Richardson had her breakout role in the independent drama Columbus (2017) for which she received a Gotham Independent Film Award for Best Actress nomination. She continued to appear in critically acclaimed independent films such as Support the Girls (2018), Unpregnant (2020), and After Yang (2022). In 2022, she appeared in the HBO  series The White Lotus.

Early life
Haley Lu Richardson was born in Phoenix, Arizona, the daughter of Valerie, a marketing and branding professional, and Forrest L. Richardson, a golf course architect. Richardson attended Villa Montessori through middle school, then Arcadia High School. She was a regular in theatrical productions and regional dance competitions throughout the Southwest. From 2001 to 2011 she was a leading dancer in Phoenix's Cannedy Dance Company. In 2011, she moved to Hollywood, California.

Career
In 2013, Richardson began a recurring role as Tess in the ABC Family series Ravenswood. She has appeared as a guest on Disney Channel's Shake It Up and was a co-star in ABC's pilot production "Adopted". She played Juliana in the Lifetime original movie Escape from Polygamy, alongside Jack Falahee. In 2016, she had a recurring role as Ellie in the Freeform drama series Recovery Road. Her early film career included a leading role in The Last Survivors as well as supporting performances in The Edge of Seventeen and Split.

Her breakthrough came in 2017 when she starred opposite John Cho in Columbus. For her work in the film she was nominated for the 2017 Gotham Independent Film Award for Best Actress. Reviewing Columbus in The New Yorker, Richard Brody praised her performance: "Richardson in particular vaults to the forefront of her generation’s actors with this performance, which virtually sings with emotional and intellectual acuity."

In 2019, Richardson starred in the romantic drama Five Feet Apart opposite Cole Sprouse. In the film she plays a cystic fibrosis patient who falls in love with a boy with the same disease.

In 2022 she played Portia in the second season of the HBO comedy The White Lotus.

Personal life
Richardson has been crocheting since the age of eight, and she has an Etsy shop where she sells accessories and crocheted clothing made from her own designs.

Filmography

Film

Television

Music videos

References

External links

 

21st-century American actresses
Actresses from Phoenix, Arizona
American child actresses
American female dancers
American film actresses
American television actresses
Dancers from Arizona
Living people
1995 births